Zahoor-ud-Din Sheikh (born 13 June 1953 in Rawalpindi, Pakistan) is a Pakistani-born Kenyan professional cricketer who has played ICC Trophy and first-class cricket for the Kenyan national side. He is a right-handed batsman and a right-arm medium-fast bowler.

References

External links

1953 births
Living people
Cricketers from Rawalpindi
Pakistani emigrants to Kenya
Kenyan cricketers
Kenya One Day International cricketers
20th-century Kenyan people